The women's 4 × 400 metres relay at the 2017 IAAF World Relays was held at the Thomas Robinson Stadium on 22 and 23 April.

Schedule

Results

Heats
Qualification: First 2 of each heat (Q) plus the 2 fastest times (q) advanced to the final. The next 8 fastest times qualified for the final B.

Final B

Final

References

4 x 400 metres relay
4 × 400 metres relay